The House by the River is a 1921 crime thriller novel by the British writer A.P. Herbert. A young poet on the verge of greatness makes advances to the family maid while his wife is away. She resists and he accidentally kills her. Panicking he persuades his friend to help his dispose of the body in the nearby River Thames. However, when the body is discovered police suspicion falls on his friend.

Film adaptation
In 1950 it was turned into an American film noir House by the River directed by Fritz Lang and starring Louis Hayward, Lee Bowman and Jane Wyatt. This shifted the action from the original setting of Hammersmith to the United States and moved the period back to the Victoria era rather than the post-First World War of the novel.

References

Bibliography
 Goble, Alan. The Complete Index to Literary Sources in Film. Walter de Gruyter, 1999.
 Miller, Ron. Mystery Classics on Film: The Adaptation of 65 Novels and Stories. McFarland, 2017.

1921 British novels
British crime novels
British thriller novels
Novels by A. P. Herbert
British novels adapted into films
Novels set in London
Methuen Publishing books